Tohami Mohamed Khaled (also known as al-Tuhamy Mohamed Khaled) (born c. 1942 or c. 1946 – 12 February 2021) was the head of the Internal Security Agency of Libya during the final years of the government of Muammar Gaddafi. He was indicted in the International Criminal Court in 2013 on charges of crimes against humanity and war crimes allegedly committed during the Libyan Civil War in 2011.

Childhood and military career 
Khaled was born near Janzur, Libya in either 1942 or 1946. He served in the armed forces of Libya, in which he supported the 1969 Libyan coup d'état, then he obtained the rank of lieutenant general and was ultimately appointed to lead the Internal Security Agency ("ISA"), Gaddafi's secret police force, which he led during the outbreak of the Libyan Civil War in 2011. During the civil war, the United States imposed sanctions against Khaled, which would have frozen any assets that he could have had in the United States.

Following the defeat of Gaddafi's forces during the Libyan Civil War in 2011, Khaled was believed to have fled to Egypt. The International Criminal Court stated that he is alleged to have had "at least 10 different passports, some issued under other identities."

International Criminal Court charges 
Tohami Khaled was indicted on 13 April 2013 on four counts of crimes against humanity and three counts of war crimes with regard to the situation in Libya. The arrest warrant against him was unsealed on 24 April 2017, as the Interpol put him on a red notice. From February 2011 through August 2011, members of the ISA arrested persons who were perceived by the Libyan government to be opposed to the rule of the Gaddafi. Persons arrested by the ISA "were subjected to various forms of mistreatment, including severe beatings, electrocution, acts of sexual violence and rape, solitary confinement, deprivation of food and water, inhumane conditions of detention, mock executions, threats of killing and rape". The ISA conducted these activities throughout Libya, including in the cities of Benghazi, Misrata, Sirte, Tajura, Tawergha, Tripoli, and Zawiya. Khaled is accused of being responsible for crimes against humanity and war crimes both as a participant and as the commander of the ISA. Specifically, the prosecutor alleges that Khaled is responsible for the crimes against humanity of imprisonment, torture, other inhumane acts, and persecution and the war crimes of torture, cruel treatment, and outrages upon personal dignity.

, Khaled was wanted by the ICC, together with Saif al-Islam Gaddafi and Libyan National Army commander Mahmoud al-Werfalli.

Death 
Libyan channels and news sites reported the death of Al-Tuhamy Khaled in Cairo on 12 February 2021, from complications related to COVID-19.

Notes

References 

1940s births
2021 deaths
Libyan military personnel
People indicted by the International Criminal Court
People of the First Libyan Civil War
Deaths from the COVID-19 pandemic in Egypt